This list of synagogues in Romania contains active, otherwise used and destroyed synagogues in Romania. The list of Romanian synagogues is not necessarily complete, as only a negligible number of sources testify to the existence of some synagogues.

Banat

Bucharest

Crișana

Dobruja

Maramureș

Moldavia

Muntenia

Oltenia

Transylvania

References

External links

 www.romanianjewish.org – Images of synagogues in Romania.
 Synagogues in Romania in the Bezalel Narkiss Index of Jewish Art, the Center for Jewish Art at the Hebrew University of Jerusalem
 Other old images, 
 Historic Synagogues of Europe: Romania
 15 romanian synagogues

Jewish Romanian history
 
Synagogues
Romania